Binjai (English:  or ,), formally Kota Binjai (Binjai City), is an independent city in the North Sumatra province of Indonesia, bordered by Deli Serdang Regency to the east and Langkat Regency to the west. Binjai is connected to Medan (the provincial capital), about 22 km to the east, by the Sumatra highway that goes to Banda Aceh, and effectively forms a part of Greater Medan. The city's population was 181,904 in the 1990 Census, 224,516 in the 2000 Census, 246,154 in the 2010 Census, and 279,302 in the 2020 Census, comprising 139,284 males and 140,018 females. In 2020, a further 47,018 inhabitants lived in Binjai District of Langkat Regency, outside the city limits but immediately north of the city.

History
The origin of Binjai when it established itself as a city is unknown. Historically, the Binjai area was situated between two Malay kingdoms, Deli and Langkat. Binjai grew from a small village on the edge of the Bingai River.

According to both oral and written accounts of the history of the area, the city of Binjai grew from a small village located on the edge of the Bingai river, approximately where the Pekan Binjai village is located today. Traditional ceremonies were held to lay the foundations of the small village in the shade of a large Binjai Tree at the edge of the Bingai river, which flows into the Wampu River, which is navigable for a large portion of its length.

Around the tree were built several houses, which were gradually enlarged, until finally a village hall was built. A lively port also developed, visited by barges from Stabat, Tanjung Pura and Strait of Malacca. Over time, the Binjai tree gave its name to the growing city.

Geography
Binjai is located between the Mencirim, Bangkatan and Bingai rivers. On average, it is 28 m above sea level. As the crow flies, Binjai is only 8 km from Medan, although Kabupaten Deli Serdang separates the two. However, the route of the Sumatara Highway increases the effective distance between the two cities to 22 km.

The two nearby rivers, the Bingai and Mencirim Rivers, satisfy the needs of the city for clean water, which is distributed by the local water company. However, there are many citizens on the outskirts of the city who rely on wells for their water supply.

Climate
Binjai has a tropical rainforest climate (Af) with heavy rainfall year-round.

Government
Binjai city is divided into five districts (kecamatan), which are further divided into 37 villages (kelurahan).

The mayoral office is located in the Town Hall, at General Sudirman Road No. 6. In 2009, Muhammad Idhaham, Msi was elected to this position for the period 2009–2014.

Formerly, Binjai was the location for the headquarters of the Langkat Police Force, which had responsibility for policing both the city of Binjai and Kabupaten Langkat. However, in 2001 the police force was split, with the creation of a Binjai police force, while the headquarters for the Langkat Police Force moved to Stabat.

Directly in front of the town hall is the Lapangan merdeka (Freedom Square), a civic open space, as well as the Pendopo Umar Baki, a building used for a variety of official and unofficial functions.

Administrative districts
The city of Binjai is divided into five administrative districts (Indonesian: kecamatan), tabulated below with their areas and their populations at the 2010 Census and the 2020 Census. The table also includes the number of administrative villages (rural desa and urban kelurahan) in each district and its post codes. 

Note: (a) mainly suburban districts of Langkat Regency, outside the city administrative region.

Demographics
Binjai is a multi-ethnic city, with Javanese, Batak, Chinese, Indian and Malay citizens. This complex ethnic mix gives Binjai a rich cultural and religious life. The total population for the city of Binjai was 279,302 at the 2020 Census. Along with Deli Serdang Regency, the city functions effectively as a suburb of Medan.

The majority of the population are Islamic, mainly of Javanese and Malay origin. The largest mosque is located in Kapten Machmud Ismail Street. The Christian population is next largest, and is mainly made up of Sumatran Christians, while the majority of Buddhists are of Chinese origin. There is one Hindu temple in Binjai, located on Ahmad Yani Street, and the Hindu population are mainly made up of ethnic Indians.

Economics and commerce

The commercial centre is located in the heart of the city. The industrial area is in the north, while farming is concentrated in the east, south and west of the city, with the west being the main area for animal husbandry. There is a 3 km2 business park in the Kelurahan Cengkeh Turi. There is also oil and gas exploration occurring in the Tandam Hilir region, to the north of the city.

In 1999, 29% of economic activity consisted of trade in goods and services, while the industrial sector contributed 23% of economic activity. The per capita income for Binjai was 3.3m rupiah, below the average for North Sumatera Province as a whole, which stood at 4.9m rupiah.

The most important agricultural sector is rambutan production, which covered 4.25 km2 with a production capacity of 2,400 tons per year. At present, the industry consists solely of the sale of fresh rambutan fruit; there is plenty of scope to modernise this industry, for instance by the introduction of canning processes and more sophisticated marketing.

There are four traditional markets in Binjai serving buyers and sellers from both Binjai and kabupaten Langkat. These are: Tavip, Kebun Lada, Brahrang and Rambung markets. There are also several modern shopping centres, including Suzuya, Mini Market Tahiti, Toserba Ramayana, the Ramayana Mall, Asia King and Binjai Supermall.

General Sudirman Street and Ahmad Yani Streets are the main shopping avenues, while the biggest and food court in Binjai is Bangkatan with Chinese and Indonesian food as specialities.

Education
As of 2005, there are 154 primary schools, 37 middle schools, 9 Islamic middle schools, 31 high schools and 10 Islamic high schools, 4 academy and 5 university. There are approximately 78,000 children attending these 241 schools.

Transport

The major forms of public transport within the city are becak, a three-wheeled motorised vehicle, and small minibusses called "Sudako". Aside from road transport out of the city, there is also a commuter train Sri Lelawangsa connecting Binjai with Medan; the continuing line to Kuala, Langkat is disused and no longer functional.

The nearest airport is Medan's Kuala Namu International Airport, while a direct toll-road connection to the nearest port is currently under construction.

Other items of interest
An important icon for the city is the Struggle of 1945 Statue, which welcomes visitors from outside the city. Binjai also used to have as historic water fountain built by the Dutch, which was used a water source for the local population, however, this was demolished and replaced by shops several years ago.

Binjai is also an important transit point for visitors to Bukit Lawang, in the Gunung Leuser National Park, an important site for the conservation of the red orangutan. Bukit Lawang is located 68 km west of Binjai.

Binjai is also the site of a nationally important military cemetery.

There are three large hospitals serving the needs of the population of Binjai. These are Korem Hospital, Binjai Public Hospital, and PTP IX Hospital.

References

 
Populated places in North Sumatra
Cities in Indonesia